Scenedesmus obliquus is a green algae species of the genus Scenedesmus.

This chlorophyte species is notable for the genetic coding of its mitochondria which translate TCA as a stop codon and TAG as leucine.  This code is represented by NCBI translation table 22, Scenedesmus obliquus mitochondrial code.

Both growth and photosynthesis of S. obliquus are affected by the presence of nano-sized microplastics, such as nano-polystyrene (nano-PS).

See also
 List of genetic codes

References

External links

Sphaeropleales